Tanzania competed at the 2009 World Championships in Athletics from 15–23 August in Berlin.

Team selection

Track and road events

Results

Men
Track and road events

Women
Track and road events

References

External links
Official competition website

Nations at the 2009 World Championships in Athletics
World Championships in Athletics
Tanzania at the World Championships in Athletics